The 2007 Marion Mayhem season was the second season for the Continental Indoor Football League (CIFL) franchise. Before the season began, 4th Down and Long LLC sold the team to Michael Burtch. Joining the team would be former Ohio State University quarterback, Stanley Jackson. Jackson would later become a part owner of the franchise due to their small budget operation. Jackson went on to set league records for pass completions (177), pass attempts (348) and interceptions thrown (16). Marion finished 6-6 in 2007, good enough to make the CIFL playoffs. After eliminating the Muskegon Thunder in the first round of the CIFL playoffs, the Mayhem's season was ended by a loss to the Michigan (formally Port Huron) Pirates.

Schedule

2007 standings

References

2007 Continental Indoor Football League season
Marion Mayhem
2007 in sports in Ohio